The association of Nazism with occultism occurs in a wide range of theories, speculation, and research into the origins of Nazism and into Nazism's possible relationship with various occult traditions. Such ideas have flourished as a part of popular culture since at least the early 1940s (during World War II), and gained renewed popularity starting in the 1960s. Historian Nicholas Goodrick-Clarke analyzed the topic in his 1985 book The Occult Roots of Nazism, in which he argued there were in fact links between some ideals of Ariosophy and Nazi ideology. He also analyzed the problems of the numerous popular occult historiography books written on the topic. Goodrick-Clarke sought to separate empiricism and sociology from the modern mythology of Nazi occultism that exists in many books which "have represented the Nazi phenomenon as the product of arcane and demonic influence".
He evaluated most of the 1960 to 1975 books on Nazi occultism as "sensational and under-researched".

Ariosophy

Historian Nicholas Goodrick-Clarke's 1985 book, The Occult Roots of Nazism, discusses the possibility of links between the ideas of the occult and those of Nazism. The book's main subject is the racist-occult movement of Ariosophy, a major strand of nationalist esotericism in Germany and Austria during the 1800s and early 1900s. He introduces his work as "an underground history, concerned with the myths, symbols, and fantasies that bear on the development of reactionary, authoritarian, and Nazi styles of thinking," arguing that "fantasies can achieve a causal status once they have been institutionalized in beliefs, values, and social groups."

In Goodrick-Clarke's view, the Ariosophist movement built on the earlier ideas of the Völkisch movement, a traditionalist, pan-German response to industrialization and urbanization, but it associated the problems of modernism specifically with the supposed misdeeds of Freemasonry, Kabbalism, and Rosicrucianism in order to "prove the modern world was based on false and evil principles". The Ariosophist "ideas and symbols filtered through to several anti-semitic and Nationalist groups in late Wilhelmian Germany, from which the early Nazi Party emerged in Munich after the First World War." He demonstrated links between two Ariosophists and Heinrich Himmler.

Modern mythology
There is a persistent idea, widely canvassed in a sensational genre of literature, that the Nazis were principally inspired and directed by occult agencies from 1920 to 1945.

Appendix E of Goodrick-Clarke's book is entitled The Modern Mythology of Nazi Occultism. In it, he gives a highly critical view of much of the popular literature on the topic. In his words, these books describe Hitler and the Nazis as being controlled by a "hidden power ... characterized either as a discarnate entity (e.g., 'black forces', 'invisible hierarchies', 'unknown superiors') or as a magical elite in a remote age or distant location". He referred to the writers of this genre as "crypto-historians". The works of the genre, he wrote,

In a new preface for the 2004 edition of The Occult Roots of Nazism, Goodrick-Clarke comments that in 1985, when his book first appeared, "Nazi black magic" was regarded as a topic for sensational authors in pursuit of strong sales."

In his 2002 work Black Sun, which was originally intended to trace the survival of occult Nazi themes in the postwar period, Goodrick-Clarke considered it necessary to readdress the topic. He devotes one chapter of the book to "the Nazi mysteries", as he terms the field of Nazi occultism there. Other reliable summaries of the development of the genre have been written by German historians. The German edition of The Occult Roots of Nazism includes an essay, "Nationalsozialismus und Okkultismus" ("National Socialism and Occultism"), which traces the origins of the speculation about Nazi occultism back to publications from the late 1930s, and which was subsequently translated by Goodrick-Clarke into English. The German historian Michael Rißmann has also included a longer "excursus" about "Nationalsozialismus und Okkultismus" in his acclaimed book on Adolf Hitler's religious beliefs.

According to Goodricke-Clarke, the speculation of Nazi occultism originated from "post-war fascination with Nazism". The "horrid fascination" of Nazism upon the Western mind emerges from the "uncanny interlude in modern history" that it presents to an observer a few decades later. The idolization of Hitler in Nazi Germany, its short-lived dominion on the European continent and Nazism's extreme antisemitism set it apart from other periods of modern history. "Outside a purely secular frame of reference, Nazism was felt to be the embodiment of evil in a modern twentieth-century regime, a monstrous pagan relapse in the Christian community of Europe."

By the early 1960s, "one could now clearly detect a mystique of Nazism." A sensationalistic and fanciful presentation of its figures and symbols, "shorn of all political and historical context", gained ground with thrillers, non-fiction books, and films and permeated "the milieu of popular culture."

Historiography concerning The Occult Roots of Nazism
The Occult Roots of Nazism is commended for specifically addressing the fanciful modern depictions of Nazi occultism, as well as carefully reflecting critical scholarly work that finds associations between Ariosophy and Nazi agency. As scholar Anna Bramwell writes, "One should not be deceived by the title into thinking that it belongs to the 'modern mythology of Nazi occultism', a world of salacious fantasy convincingly dismembered by the author in an Appendix,"  referring to the various written, depicted, and produced material that delves into Nazi occultism without providing any reliable or relevant evidence. Instead, it is through Goodrick-Clarke's work that several scholarly criticisms addressing occult relevance in conjunction with Ariosophist practices arise.

Historians like Martyn Housden and Jeremy Noakes commend Goodrick-Clarke for addressing the relationship between Ariosophic ideologies rooted in certain Germanic cultures and the actual agency of Nazi hierarchy; the problem, as Housden remarks, lies in the efficacy of these Ariosophic practices. As he remarks, "The true value of this study, therefore, lies in its painstaking elucidation of an intrinsically fascinating subculture which helped colour rather than cause aspects of Nazism. In this context, it also leaves us pondering a central issue: why on earth were Austrian and German occultists, just like the Nazi leadership, quite so susceptible to, indeed obsessed by, specifically aggressive racist beliefs anyway?" Noakes continues this general thought by concluding, "[Goodrick-Clarke] provides not only a definitive account of the influence of Ariosophy on Nazism, a subject which is prone to sensationalism, but also fascinating insights into the intellectual climate of the late nineteenth and early twentieth century." These reviews reflect the greatest dilemmas in Nazi occultist scholarship; the discernment between actual efficacy of possible occult practices by Nazi leaders, purpose of these practices, and modern notions and applications of occultism today largely impact the appropriate scholarship in general in making connections between plausible Nazi Ariosophic practices and blatant popular myth.

The linkages Goodrick-Clarke makes concerning Ariosophy and German society are further detailed in Peter Merkl's Political Violence under the Swastika, in which "pre-1933 Nazis", various NSDAP members, volunteered to write their memoirs and recollections about the rise of the Nazi Party in order to provide a coherent, statistical analysis of the motivations and ideals these early members hoped to pursue in German politics. From the findings, Merkl has found, through statistical evidence, that there were aspects of ideology within German society that favored intense German nationalism, ranging from what was considered to be a "German Romantic", one who was "beholden to the cultural and historical traditions of old Germany..." to someone classified as a part of an alleged "Nordic/Hitler Cult", one who followed Voelkisch (traditional, antisemitic) beliefs. To further prove the point, Merkl discovered that of those willing to submit their testimonies, "Protestants tended to be German Romantics, Catholics to be anti-Semites, superpatriots, and solidarists. Areas of religious homogeneity were particularly high in anti-Semitism or in the Nordic-German cult," of which members of both religious groups were prone to "Judenkoller", an alleged sudden and violent sickness that would manifest either in blatant hatred or hysteria at being within proximity of Jews. Coincidentally, Merkl mentions a relationship to this Nordic/German-agrarian cult in relation to the 19th century to a "crypto-Nazi tradition", despite being written ten years prior to The Occult Roots of Nazism.

Some of this modern mythology even touches Goodrick-Clarke's topic directly. The rumor that Adolf Hitler had encountered the Austrian monk and antisemitic publicist Lanz von Liebenfels, already at the age of 8, at Heilgenkreuz abbey, goes back to Les mystiques du soleil (1971) by Michel-Jean Angbert. "This episode is wholly imaginary."

Nevertheless, Michel-Jean Angbert and the other authors discussed by Goodrick-Clarke present their accounts as real, so that this modern mythology has led to several legends that resemble conspiracy theories, concerning, for example, the Vril Society or rumours about Karl Haushofer's connection to the occult. The most influential books were Trevor Ravenscroft's The Spear of Destiny and The Morning of the Magicians by Pauwels and Bergier.

Claims
One of the earliest claims of Nazi occultism can be found in Lewis Spence's book Occult Causes of the Present War (1940). According to Spence, Alfred Rosenberg and his book The Myth of the Twentieth Century were responsible for promoting pagan, occult and anti-Christian ideas that motivated the Nazi party.

Demonic possession of Hitler
For a demonic influence on Hitler, Hermann Rauschning's Hitler Speaks is brought forward as a source. However, most modern scholars do not consider Rauschning reliable. (As Nicholas Goodrick-Clarke summarises, "recent scholarship has almost certainly proved that Rauschning's conversations were mostly invented".)

Similarly to Rauschning, August Kubizek, one of Hitler's closest friends since childhood, claims that Hitler—17 years old at the time—once spoke to him of "returning Germany to its former glory"; of this comment August said, "It was as if another being spoke out of his body, and moved him as much as it did me."

An article "Hitler's Forgotten Library" by Timothy Ryback, published in The Atlantic (May 2003), mentions a book from Hitler's private library authored by Ernst Schertel. Schertel, whose interests were flagellation, dance, occultism, nudism and BDSM, had also been active as an activist for sexual liberation before 1933. He had been imprisoned in Nazi Germany for seven months and his doctoral degree was revoked. He is supposed to have sent a dedicated copy of his 1923 book Magic: History, Theory and Practice to Hitler some time in the mid-1920s. Hitler is said to have marked extensive passages, including one which reads "He who does not have the demonic seed within himself will never give birth to a magical world".

Theosophist Alice A. Bailey stated during World War II that Adolf Hitler was possessed by what she called the Dark Forces. Her follower Benjamin Creme has stated that through Hitler (and a group of equally evil men around him in Nazi Germany, together with a group of militarists in Japan and a further group around Mussolini in Italy) was released the energies of the Antichrist, which, according to theosophical teachings is not an individual person but forces of destruction.

According to James Herbert Brennan in his book Occult Reich, Hitler's mentor, Dietrich Eckhart (to whom Hitler dedicates Mein Kampf), wrote to a friend of his in 1923: "Follow Hitler! He will dance, but it is I who have called the tune. We have given him the 'means of communication' with Them. Do not mourn for me; I shall have influenced history more than any other German."

New World Order
Conspiracy theorists "frequently identify German National Socialism among other things as a precursor of the New World Order". With regard to Hitler's later ambition of imposing the Nazi regime throughout Europe, Nazi propaganda used the term Neuordnung (often poorly translated as "the New Order", while actually referring to the "re-structurization" of state borders on the European map and the resulting post-war economic hegemony of Greater Germany), so one could probably say that the Nazis pursued a new world order in terms of politics. But the claim that Hitler and the Thule Society conspired to create a New World Order (a conspiracy theory, put forward on some webpages) is completely unfounded.

Aleister Crowley
There are also unverifiable rumours that the occultist Aleister Crowley sought to contact Hitler during World War II. Despite several allegations and speculations to the contrary, there is no evidence of such an encounter. In 1991, John Symonds, one of Crowley's literary executors, published a book: The Medusa's Head or Conversations Between Aleister Crowley and Adolf Hitler, which has definitively been shown to be literary fiction. That the edition of this book was limited to 350 also contributed to the mystery surrounding the topic. Mention of a contact between Crowley and Hitler—without any sources or evidence—is also made in a letter from René Guénon to Julius Evola dated October 29, 1949, which later reached a broader audience.

Erik Jan Hanussen
The documentary Hitler and the Occult describes how Hitler "seemed endowed with even greater authority and charisma" after he had resumed public speaking in March 1927. The narrator states that "this may have been due to the influence" of the clairvoyant performer and publicist Erik Jan Hanussen. "Hanussen helped Hitler perfect a series of exaggerated poses," useful for speaking before a huge audience. The documentary then interviews Dusty Sklar about the contact between Hitler and Hanussen, and the narrator makes the statement about "occult techniques of mind control and crowd domination."

Whether Hitler had met Hanussen at all is not certain. That he even encountered him before March 1927 is not confirmed by other sources about Hanussen. In the late 1920s to early 1930s Hanussen made political predictions in his own newspaper, Hanussens Bunte Wochenschau, that gradually started to favour Hitler, but until late 1932 these predictions varied. In 1929, Hanussen predicted, for example, that Wilhelm II would return to Germany in 1930 and that the problem of unemployment would be solved in 1931.

Nazi mysticism, occultism, and science fiction
Nazi mysticism in German culture is further expanded upon within Manfred Nagl's article "SF (Science Fiction), Occult Sciences, and Nazi Myths", published in the journal Science Fiction Studies. In it, Nagl writes that the racial narratives described in contemporary German Science Fiction stories, like The Last Queen of Atlantis, by Edmund Kiss, provide further notions of racial superiority under the auspices of Ariosophy, Aryanism, and alleged historic racial Mysticism, suggesting that writings associated with possible Occultism, Ariosophy, or Aryanism were products intended to influence and justify in a socio-political manner, rather than simply establish cultural heritage. The stories themselves dealt with "...heroes, charismatic leader types, (who) have been chosen by fate—with the resources of a sophisticated and extremely powerful technology". Nagl considers science fiction pieces like Atlantis further fueled the violent persuasiveness of Nazi leaders, such as Adolf Hitler and Heinrich Himmler, as further justification for a "Nazi elite (envisioning) for itself in occupied East European territories". This, in turn, allegedly propagated public support of Nazi ideology, summated by Nagl as "a tremendous turning back of culture, away from the age of reason and consciousness, toward the age of a 'sleepwalking certainty', the age of supra-rational magic".

Crypto-historic books
In the essay that is included in the German edition of The Occult Roots..., H. T. Hakl, an Austrian publisher of esoteric works, traces the origins of the speculation about Nazism and Occultism back to several works from the early 1940s. His research was also published in a short book, Unknown sources: National Socialism and the Occult, translated by Goodrick-Clarke. Already in 1933 a pseudonymous Kurt van Emsen described Hitler as a "demonic personality", but his work was soon forgotten. The first allusions that Hitler was directed by occult forces which were taken up by the later authors came from French Christian esotericist René Kopp. In two articles published in the monthly esoteric journal Le Chariot from June 1934 and April 1939, he seeks to trace the source of Hitler's power to supernatural forces. The second article was titled: "L'Enigme du Hitler". In other French esoteric journals of the 1930s, Hakl could not find similar hints. In 1939 another French author, Edouard Saby, published a book: Hitler et les Forces Occultes. Saby already mentions Hanussen and Ignaz Trebitsch-Lincoln. Hakl even hints that Edouard Saby would have the copyright on the myth of Nazi occultism. However, another significant book from 1939 is better known: Hermann Rauschning's Hitler Speaks. There it is said (in the chapter "Black and White Magic"), that "Hitler surrendered himself to forces that carried him away. ... He turned himself over to a spell, which can, with good reason and not simply in a figurative analogy, be described as demonic magic."  The chapter "Hitler in private" is even more dramatic, and was left out in the German edition from 1940.

Goodrick-Clarke examines several pseudo-historic "books written about Nazi occultism between 1960 and 1975", that "were typically sensational and under-researched". He terms this genre "crypto-history", as its defining element and "final point of explanatory reference is an agent which has remained concealed to previous historians of National Socialism". Characteristic tendencies of this literature include: (1) "a complete ignorance of primary sources" and (2) the repetition of "inaccuracies and wild claims", without the attempt being made to confirm even "wholly spurious 'facts'". Books debunked in Appendix E of The Occult Roots of Nazism are:
 Louis Pauwels and Jacques Bergier, 1960, The Morning of the Magicians
 Dietrich Bronder, 1964, Bevor Hitler kam
 Trevor Ravenscroft, 1972, The Spear of Destiny
 Michel-Jean Angbert, 1971, Les mystiques du soleil
 J. H. Brennan, 1974, The Occult Reich
 Otto Rahn, 1937, Luzifers Hofgesind, eine Reise zu den guten Geistern Europas (Lucifer's Court: A Heretic's Journey in Search of the Light Bringers).

These books are only mentioned in the Appendix. Otherwise the whole book by Goodrick-Clarke does without any reference to this kind of literature; it uses other sources. This literature is not reliable; however, books published after the emergence of The Occult Roots of Nazism continue to repeat claims that have been proven false:
 Wulf Schwarzwaller, 1988, The Unknown Hitler
 Alan Baker, 2000, Invisible Eagle. The History of Nazi Occultism

Documentaries
More than 60 years after the end of the Third Reich, Nazism and Adolf Hitler have become a recurring subject in history documentaries. Among these documentaries, there are several that focus especially on the potential relations between Nazism and occultism, such as the History Channel's documentary Hitler and the Occult. As evidence of Hitler's "occult power" this documentary offers, for example, the infamous statement by Joachim von Ribbentrop of his continued subservience to Hitler at the Nuremberg Trials. After the author Dusty Sklar has pointed out that Hitler's suicide happened at the night of April 30/May 1, which is Walpurgis Night, the narrator continues: "With Hitler gone, it was as if a spell had been broken". A much more plausible reason for Hitler's suicide (that does not involve the paranormal) is that the Russians had already closed to within several hundred meters of Hitler's bunker and he did not want to be captured alive.

From the perspective of academic history, these documentaries on Nazism, if ever commented, are seen as problematic because they do not contribute to an actual understanding of the problems that arise in the study of Nazism and Neo-Nazism. Without referring to a specific documentary Mattias Gardell, a historian who studies contemporary separatist groups, writes:

Hitler and the Occult includes a scene in which Hitler is seen as speaking at a huge mass meeting. While Hitler's speech is not translated, the narrator talks about the German occultist and stage mentalist Erik Jan Hanussen: "Occultists believe, Hanussen may also have imparted occult techniques of mind control and crowd domination on Hitler" (see below). Historians have dismissed myths such as those about Erik Jan Hanussen.

Ernst Schäfer's expedition to Tibet
At least one documentary, Hitler's Search for the Holy Grail, includes footage from the 1939 German expedition to Tibet. The documentary describes it as "the most ambitious expedition" of the SS. This original video material was made accessible again by Marco Dolcetta in his series Il Nazismo Esoterico in 1994. An interview that Dolcetta conducted with Schäfer does not support the theories of Nazi occultism, neither does Reinhard Greve's 1995 article Tibetforschung im SS Ahnenerbe (Tibet Research Within the SS Ahnenerbe), although the latter does mention the occult thesis. Hakl comments that Greve should have emphasized more strongly the unreliability of authors like Bergier and Pauwels or Angbert. Ernst Schäfer's expedition report explicitly remarks on the "worthless goings-on"   by "a whole army of quacksalvers" concerning Asia and especially Tibet.

List of documentaries

German
 Hans-Jürgen Syberberg's Hitler – Ein Film aus Deutschland  (Hitler, A Film From Germany) (1977). Originally presented on German television, this is a seven-hour work in four parts: The Grail; A German Dream; The End Of Winter's Tale; We, Children Of Hell. The director uses documentary clips, photographic backgrounds, puppets, theatrical stages, and other elements from almost all the visual arts, with the "actors" addressing directly the audience/camera, in order to approach and expand on this most taboo subject of European history of the 20th century.
 Schwarze Sonne (2001) documentary by Rüdiger Sünner. Sünner also produced a book to accompany this documentary.

English
 The Occult History of the Third Reich (1991), narrated by Patrick Allen, directed by Dave Flitton.
 Adolf Hitler
 The SS: Blood and Soil
 The Enigma of the Swastika
 Himmler the Mystic
 Unsolved Mysteries of World War II (1992): Occult & Secrets, also known as Volume 3 in the series. (Different releases contain different episodes.)
 Hitler's Secret Weapons
 The Riddle of Rudolph Hess
 Himmler's Castle: Wewelsburg
 The Last Days of Hitler
 Decision At Dunkirk
 Stalin's Secret Armies
 In 1994, Channel 4 aired a Michael Wood documentary entitled Hitler's Search for the Holy Grail, as part of its "Secret History" series.
 Nazis: The Occult Conspiracy (1998), directed by Tracy Atkinson and Joan Baran, narrated by Malcolm McDowell.
 Decoding the Past episode: The Nazi Prophecies (2005) by The History Channel.

See also

 Adolf Hitler in popular culture
 Ariosophy
 Ahnenerbe
 Black Sun (symbol)
 Esoteric Nazism
 Esotericism in Germany and Austria
 German Christians (movement)
 Julleuchter
 Magic: History, Theory and Practice
 Nazi archaeology
 Nazi UFOs
 Nazis: The Occult Conspiracy
 The Occult History of the Third Reich
 Positive Christianity
 Protestant Reich Church
 Religion in Nazi Germany
 Religious aspects of Nazism
 Religious views of Adolf Hitler
 Walter Johannes Stein

References

Citations

Other references
 Bruno Frei. 1980. Der Hellseher: Leben und Sterben des Erik Jan Hanussen. Antonia Gruneberg, ed. Cologne: Prometh .
 Mattias Gardell. 2003. Gods of the Blood: The Pagan Revival and White Separatism. Durham, NC: Duke University Press. .

Further reading 
 Igor Barinov. 2013. Tabu i mify Tret'ego Reikha (Taboo and Myths of the Third Reich). Moscow, Pskov. .
 Carrie B. Dohe. Jung's Wandering Archetype: Race and Religion in Analytical Psychology. London: Routledge, 2016  .
 Florian Evers. 2011. Vexierbilder des Holocaust. LIT Verlag Münster. .
 Nicholas Goodrick-Clarke. 1985. The Occult Roots of Nazism: Secret Aryan Cults and Their Influence on Nazi Ideology: The Ariosophists of Austria and Germany, 1890–1935. Wellingborough, England: The Aquarian Press. . (Several reprints.) Expanded with a new Preface, 2004, I.B. Tauris & Co. .
 Nicholas Goodrick-Clarke. 2002. Black Sun: Aryan Cults, Esoteric Nazism and the Politics of Identity. New York University Press. . (Paperback, 2003. )
 Hans Thomas Hakl. 1997: Nationalsozialismus und Okkultismus.  In: Nicholas Goodrick-Clarke: Die okkulten Wurzeln des Nationalsozialismus. Graz, Austria: Stocker (German edition of The Occult Roots of Nazism)
 Hans Thomas Hakl. National Socialism and the Occult, Edmonds, WA, Holmes Publishing Group, 2000. .
 Eric Kurlander. Hitler's Monsters: A Supernatural History of the Third Reich. New Haven: Yale University Press, 2017. .
 Michael Rißmann. 2001. Hitlers Gott. Vorsehungsglaube und Sendungsbewußtsein des deutschen Diktators . esp. pp. 137–172; Zürich, Munich. Pendo
 Julian Strube. 2012. Die Erfindung des esoterischen Nationalsozialismus im Zeichen der Schwarzen Sonne . In: Zeitschrift für Religionswissenschaft, 20(2): 223–268.

External links
 The Occult Roots of Nazism by Nicholas Goodrick-Clarke – Short article at www.lapismagazine.org.
 Magic Realism – A book review  by William Main of The Occult Roots of Nazism, taken from the December 1994 issue of Fidelity magazine.
 Nationalsozialismus und Okkultismus? Die Thule-Gesellschaft  Article on an information page from the Swiss Reformed Church.
 NARA Research Room: Captured German and Related Records on Microform in the National Archives: Captured German Records Filmed at Berlin (American Historical Association, 1960). Microfilm Publication T580. 1,002 rolls, including among, others, files of the Ahnenerbe and the Nachlass of Walter Darré.
 Hitler and the Occult: Nazism, Reincarnation, and Rock Culture.
 White Blood, White Gods: An Assessment of Racialist Paganism in the United States – A Senior Honors Thesis by Damon Berry in June 2006.
 "Hitler and the Secret Societies" by Julius Evola (from Il Conciliatore, no. 10, 1971; translated from the German edition in Deutsche Stimme, no. 8, 1998).
 Von Aldebaran bis Vril. Interview über esoterischen Neonazismus  Interview, Religionswissenschaftlicher Medien- und Informationsdienst, April 2013.
 

 
Germanic neopaganism
Heinrich Himmler
Nazism in popular culture
Pseudohistory